Radical 172 or radical short tailed bird meaning "bird" or "short-tailed bird" is one of the 9 Kangxi radicals (214 radicals in total) composed of 8 strokes.

In the Kangxi Dictionary, there are 233 characters (out of 49,030) to be found under this radical.

 is also the 174th indexing component in the Table of Indexing Chinese Character Components predominantly adopted by Simplified Chinese dictionaries published in mainland China.

Evolution

Derived characters

Variant Forms
There is a difference in Japanese and Chinese in printing typefaces for this third stroke of this radical. In the Kangxi Dictionary and in Japanese, the form with a short line slanting downward to the left on top of the first horizontal line is used. In both Simplified Chinese (mainland China, Singapore) and standard Traditional Chinese (Taiwan, Hong Kong, and Macau), the form with a dot slanting downwards to the right on top of the horizontal line is used, while the Kangxi Dictionary form is still widely used in Traditional Chinese publications.

This difference may also apply to handwritten forms, albeit not always strictly followed.

Literature

References

External links

Unihan Database - U+96B9

172
174